Gilles Simon was the defending champion, but withdrew with a right wrist injury before the tournament began.

David Goffin won the title, defeating João Sousa in the final, 6–4, 6–3.

Seeds
The top four seeds receive a bye into the second round.

Draw

Finals

Top half

Bottom half

Qualifying

Seeds

Qualifiers

Qualifying draw

First qualifier

Second qualifier

Third qualifier

Fourth qualifier

External links
 Main draw
 Qualifying draw

Singles
Moselle Open - Singles